Gradiconus is a synonym of a subgenus  of sea snails, marine gastropod mollusks in the genus Conus,  family Conidae, the cone snails and their allies. T

In the new classification of the family Conidae by Puillandre N., Duda T.F., Meyer C., Olivera B.M. & Bouchet P. (2015), Gradiconus has become a subgenus of Conus: Conus (Dauciconus) Cotton, 1945 (type species: Conus gradatus W. Wood, 1828) represented as Conus Thiele, 1929

Distinguishing characteristics
The Tucker & Tenorio 2009 taxonomy distinguishes Gradiconus from Conus in the following ways:

 Genus Conus sensu stricto Linnaeus, 1758
 Shell characters (living and fossil species)
The basic shell shape is conical to elongated conical, has a deep anal notch on the shoulder, a smooth periostracum and a small operculum. The shoulder of the shell is usually nodulose and the protoconch is usually multispiral. Markings often include the presence of tents except for black or white color variants, with the absence of spiral lines of minute tents and textile bars.
Radular tooth (not known for fossil species)
The radula has an elongated anterior section with serrations and a large exposed terminating cusp, a non-obvious waist, blade is either small or absent and has a short barb, and lacks a basal spur.
Geographical distribution
These species are found in the Indo-Pacific region.
Feeding habits
These species eat other gastropods including cones.

 Subgenus Gradiconus da Motta, 1991
Shell characters (living and fossil species)
The shell is turbinate in shape.  The protoconch is paucispiral, cords are either absent or disappear in the early postnuclear whorls.  The anal notch is deep.  The shell may be ornamented with hemispherical nodules undulating along the shoulder angle in the early postnuclear whorls, and ridges may persist or die out on the body whorl.  The color pattern consists of dots or dashes in spiral lines and/or longitudinal markings.  The periostracum is tufted or has a fringe along the shoulder angle, and the operculum is small to minute.
Radular tooth (not known for fossil species)
The anterior section of the radular tooth is roughly equal to the length of the posterior section, and the blade is more than half the length of the anterior section.  A basal spur is present, the barb is short, and there is an internal terminating cusp.  The radular tooth is serrated.
Geographical distribution
The species in this genus occur in the West Atlantic and Eastern Pacific regions.
Feeding habits
These cone snails are vermivorous, meaning that the cones prey on polychaete worms.

Species list
This list of species is based on the information in the World Register of Marine Species (WoRMS) list.

The following species names are recognized as "alternate representations" (see full explanation below) in contrast to the traditional system, which uses the genus Conus for all species in the family:
 Gradiconus anabathrum (Crosse, 1865): synonym of Conus anabathrum Crosse, 1865
 Gradiconus aureopunctatus (Petuch, 1987) : synonym of Conus aureopunctatus Petuch, 1987
 Gradiconus bayeri (Petuch, 1987): synonym of Conus bayeri Petuch, 1987
 Gradiconus brunneofilaris (Petuch, 1990): synonym of Conus brunneofilaris Petuch, 1990
 Gradiconus burryae (Clench, 1942): synonym of Conus burryae Clench, 1942
 Gradiconus castaneus (Kiener, 1848): synonym of Conus castaneus Kiener, 1848
 Gradiconus ceruttii (Cargile, 1997): synonym of Conus ceruttii Cargile, 1997
 Gradiconus cingulatus (Lamarck, 1810): synonym of Conus cingulatus Lamarck, 1810
 Gradiconus dispar (G.B. Sowerby I, 1833): synonym of Conus dispar G.B. Sowerby I, 1833
 Gradiconus ernesti (Petuch, 1990): synonym of Conus ernesti Petuch, 1990
 Gradiconus flamingo (Petuch, 1980): synonym of Conus flamingo Petuch, 1980
 Gradiconus flavescens (G.B. Sowerby I, 1834): synonym of Conus flavescens G.B. Sowerby I, 1834
 Gradiconus garciai (da Motta, 1982): synonym of Conus garciai da Motta, 1982
 Gradiconus gibsonsmithorum (Petuch, 1986): synonym of Conus gibsonsmithorum Petuch, 1986
 Gradiconus gradatus (Wood, 1828): synonym of Conus gradatus Wood, 1828
 Gradiconus honkerorum Petuch & R. F. Myers, 2014: synonym of Conus honkerorum (Petuch & R. F. Myers, 2014)
 Gradiconus largilliertii (Kiener, 1847): synonym of Conus largilliertii Kiener, 1847
 Gradiconus maya Petuch & Sargent, 2011: synonym of Conus maya (Petuch & Sargent, 2011)
 Gradiconus mazzolii Petuch & Sargent, 2011: synonym of Conus burryae Clench, 1942
 Gradiconus monilifer (Broderip, 1833): synonym of Conus monilifer Broderip, 1833
 Gradiconus nybakkeni Tenorio, Tucker & Chaney, 2012: synonym of Conus nybakkeni (Tenorio, Tucker & Chaney, 2012)
 Gradiconus ostrinus Tucker & Tenorio, 2011: synonym of Conus ostrinus (Tucker & Tenorio, 2011)
 Gradiconus parascalaris (Petuch, 1987): synonym of Conus parascalaris Petuch, 1987
 Gradiconus paschalli (Petuch, 1998): synonym of Conus paschalli Petuch, 1998
 Gradiconus patglicksteinae (Petuch, 1987): synonym of Conus patglicksteinae Petuch, 1987
 Gradiconus paulae (Petuch, 1988): synonym of Conus paulae Petuch, 1988
 Gradiconus philippii (Kiener, 1845): synonym of Conus philippii Kiener, 1845
 Gradiconus portobeloensis (Petuch, 1990): synonym of Conus portobeloensis Petuch, 1990
 Gradiconus recurvus (Broderip, 1833): synonym of Conus recurvus Broderip, 1833
 Gradiconus regularis (G.B. Sowerby I, 1833): synonym of Conus regularis G.B. Sowerby I, 1833
 Gradiconus rosemaryae (Petuch, 1990): synonym of Conus rosemaryae Petuch, 1990
 Gradiconus scalaris (Valenciennes, 1832): synonym of Conus scalaris Valenciennes, 1832
 Gradiconus scalarissimus (da Motta, 1988): synonym of Conus scalarissimus da Motta, 1988
 Gradiconus sennottorum (Rehder & Abbott, 1951): synonym of Conus sennottorum Rehder & Abbott, 1951
 Gradiconus skoglundae Tenorio, Tucker & Chaney, 2012: synonym of Conus skoglundae (Tenorio, Tucker & Chaney, 2012)
 Gradiconus sunderlandi (Petuch, 1987): synonym of Conus sunderlandi Petuch, 1987
 Gradiconus tortuganus Petuch & Sargent, 2011: synonym of Conus burryae Clench, 1942
 Gradiconus tristensis (Petuch, 1987): synonym of Conus tristensis Petuch, 1987

Significance of "alternative representation"
Prior to 2009, all species within the family Conidae were placed in one genus, Conus. In 2009 however, J.K. Tucker and M.J. Tenorio proposed a classification system for the over 600 recognized species that were in the family. Their classification proposed 3 distinct families and 82 genera for the living species of cone snails. This classification was based upon shell morphology, radular differences, anatomy, physiology, cladistics, with comparisons to molecular (DNA) studies. Published accounts of genera within the Conidae that include the genus Gradiconus include J.K. Tucker & M.J. Tenorio (2009), and Bouchet et al. (2011).

Testing in order to try to understand the molecular phylogeny of the Conidae was initially begun by Christopher Meyer and Alan Kohn, and is continuing, particularly with the advent of nuclear DNA testing in addition to mDNA testing.

However, in 2011, some experts still prefer to use the traditional classification, where all species are placed in Conus within the single family Conidae: for example, according to the current November 2011 version of the World Register of Marine Species, all species within the family Conidae are in the genus Conus. The binomial names of species in the 82 cone snail genera listed in Tucker & Tenorio 2009 are recognized by the World Register of Marine Species as "alternative representations."  Debate within the scientific community regarding this issue continues, and additional molecular phylogeny studies are being carried out in an attempt to clarify the issue.

In 2015, in the Journal of Molluscan Studies, Puillandre, Duda, Meyer, Olivera & Bouchet presented a new classification for the old genus Conus. Using 329 species, the authors carried out molecular phylogenetic analyses. The results suggested that the authors should place all cone snails in a single family, Conidae, containing four genera: Conus, Conasprella, Profundiconus and Californiconus. The authors group 85% of all known cone snail species under Conus, They recognize 57 subgenera within Conus, and 11 subgenera within the genus Conasprella.

References

Further reading 
 Kohn A. A. (1992). Chronological Taxonomy of Conus, 1758-1840". Smithsonian Institution Press, Washington and London.
 Monteiro A. (ed.) (2007). The Cone Collector 1: 1-28.
 Berschauer D. (2010). Technology and the Fall of the Mono-Generic Family The Cone Collector 15: pp. 51-54
 Puillandre N., Meyer C.P., Bouchet P., and Olivera B.M. (2011), Genetic divergence and geographical variation in the deep-water Conus orbignyi complex (Mollusca: Conoidea)'', Zoologica Scripta 40(4) 350-363.

External links
 To World Register of Marine Species
  Gastropods.com: Conidae setting forth the genera recognized therein.

Conidae
Gastropod subgenera